Moonshine is the eighth album by Scottish folk musician Bert Jansch, released in 1973.

On 16 October 2015, Earth Recordings reissued the album in digital, CD, and vinyl formats; the latter additionally available as a picture disc.

Track listing 
 "Yarrow" (Traditional; arranged by Bert Jansch) - 5:09
 "Brought with the Rain" (Jansch, traditional) - 2:55
 "The January Man" (Dave Goulder) - 3:31
 "Night Time Blues" (Jansch) - 7:14
 "Moonshine" (Jansch) - 4:56
 "The First Time Ever I Saw Your Face" (Ewan MacColl) - 3:00
 "Ramble Away" (Traditional; arranged by Bert Jansch) - 4:35
 "Twa Corbies" (Traditional; arranged by Bert Jansch) - 3:00
 "Oh My Father" (Jansch) - 4:07

Personnel 
 Bert Jansch - vocals, guitars
 Danny Thompson - bass
 Tony Visconti - electric bass, recorder, percussion, musical arrangements
 Gary Boyle - electric guitar
 Aly Bain - fiddle
 Ralph McTell - harmonica
 Skaila Kanga - harp
 Laurie Allan - drums
 Dave Mattacks - drums
 Dannie Richmond - drums on 6
 Mary Hopkin - lead vocals on 6
 Les Quatre Flute a Bec Consort - flutes
 Richard Adeney - flute
 Thea King - clarinet
 Marilyn Sanson - cello
Technical
 Danny Thompson - producer
John Wood, Victor Gamm - engineers
Heather Jansch - cover design

References 

Bert Jansch albums
1973 albums
Albums arranged by Tony Visconti
Reprise Records albums